Doamna Marica Brâncoveanu (circa 1661 – 1729) was a princess consort of Wallachia by marriage to Constantin Brancoveanu (r. 1688–1714).

She married Constantin Brancoveanu in 1674. She supported and actively participated in the culture policy of her spouse. She had books printed in Romanian, Greek, Slavic, Arabic, Turkic and Georgian, and founded libraries with Western books. She is especially known for her support to the St Sava convent. After the deposition of her spouse in 1714, she was brought as a prisoner to Constantinople by the Ottoman along with the rest of her family. Her spouse and sons were murdered. She was eventually released, and exiled to Kutai, near the eastern shore of the Black Sea. She was allowed to return to Bucharest in 1716. In 1720, she managed to have the remains of her spouse and sons brought back to Wallachia and buried.

References
 Marcu, George (coord.) - Dicţionarul personalităţilor feminine din România, Editura Meronia, Bucureşti, 2009

1729 deaths
17th-century Romanian people
18th-century Romanian people
Royal consorts of Wallachia
Year of birth unknown
18th-century Romanian women
17th-century Romanian women
Year of birth uncertain